Ibrahima Baldé (born 4 April 1989), known as Ibrahima, is a Senegalese professional footballer who plays as a forward for Turkish club Boluspor.

Club career

Early years and Spain
Ibrahima was born in Dakar. In 2006 the 16-year-old arrived in Argentina after signing for Argentinos Juniors and, the following year, he joined another team in that nation, Club Atlético Vélez Sarsfield. He later said of his time in the country: "When I went to Argentina I could never imagine how many troubles and personal insults I would have to experience because of my skin colour there".

In December 2008, Ibrahima continued his development as he joined Atlético Madrid, being initially allocated to its B side. Due to injuries to the first team's offensive line – Florent Sinama Pongolle had also just been sold – he made his La Liga debut on 2 January 2010, playing the full 90 minutes against Sevilla FC at the Vicente Calderón Stadium in a 2–1 win.

In the same month, on the 17th, Ibrahima scored his first goal with Atlético's main squad, in another home win, 3–2 against Sporting de Gijón: after just five minutes on the pitch, he tapped in Sergio Agüero's saved attempt to make it 3–1.

On 5 March 2010, Ibrahima extended his contract with Atlético until 2013, scoring a last-minute equaliser in a 1–1 draw at Real Zaragoza two days later. He was loaned to CD Numancia in Segunda División in the summer, in a season-long move.

Ibrahima's spell with the Soria club was greatly undermined by injury, as he appeared in less than half of the league's matches. On 13 April 2011, he agreed to join CA Osasuna on a three-year deal effective as of July, with a buyout clause of €9 million.

During his tenure at the El Sadar Stadium, Ibrahima netted seven goals in 23 overall appearances, including a brace against Getafe CF (2–2 away draw) and the game's only to help the hosts defeat Real Sociedad in the league. He was also afflicted by physical problems.

Kuban

On 23 August 2012, Ibrahima signed with FC Kuban Krasnodar, penning a three-year contract– he stated he would not have problems adapting to the new reality, even though his move was delayed due to visa issues. Four days later he scored twice on his debut, and also set up a goal for Marcos Pizzelli in a 6–2 victory over FC Volga Nizhny Novgorod, before coming off in the 71st minute.

During a friendly match in early 2014, Ibrahima suffered a ligament rupture to his knee, going on to be sidelined for several months. He netted only four times from 21 appearances in the 2015–16 campaign, and his team was relegated from the Russian Premier League after ranking third from bottom.

With his contract expected to expire on 30 June 2016, Ibrahima reportedly rejected a new deal in December 2015. General manager Valery Statsenko expressed his confidence on an agreement being reached, and negotiations started in March 2016; on 1 July, however, Kuban announced the player's departure.

Reims
On 31 July 2016, Ibrahima moved to French club Stade de Reims on a 1+1 deal. He made his Ligue 2 debut in the fourth matchday, starting and playing 79 minutes in a 2–1 home defeat of Red Star FC, and his first goal arrived on 22 October to help to a 1–1 draw at RC Lens.

CFR Cluj
Ibrahima signed a two-year deal with Romanian side CFR Cluj in July 2017, rejoining his former Kuban Krasnodar coach Dan Petrescu. He made his Liga I debut against FC Voluntari on 20 August, coming on as an 83rd-minute substitute for Urko Vera. He scored his first goals for the club six days later against ACS Poli Timișoara, netting twice in the 4–3 away loss.

Later career
On 3 August 2018, Ibrahima returned to Spain after agreeing to a two-year contract with Real Oviedo in the second division. He competed in Turkey the following seasons, with Giresunspor and Boluspor.

International career
Ibrahima was first called up by the Senegal national team in May 2012, and made his debut on the 25th by playing 63 minutes in a 1–0 friendly win over Morocco. He scored his first goal the following week, helping to a 3–1 home victory against Liberia for the 2014 FIFA World Cup qualifiers.

Later in the year, Ibrahima was selected by the under-23 side for the Summer Olympics in London. He played in three of four matches during the tournament, netting in the 2–4 quarter-final loss to Mexico.

Honours
Atlético Madrid
Copa del Rey runner-up: 2009–10

Kuban
Russian Cup runner-up: 2014–15

CFR Cluj
Liga I: 2017–18

References

External links

1989 births
Living people
Footballers from Dakar
Senegalese footballers
Association football forwards
La Liga players
Segunda División players
Segunda División B players
Atlético Madrid B players
Atlético Madrid footballers
CD Numancia players
CA Osasuna players
Real Oviedo players
Russian Premier League players
FC Kuban Krasnodar players
Ligue 2 players
Stade de Reims players
Liga I players
CFR Cluj players
Süper Lig players
TFF First League players
Giresunspor footballers
Boluspor footballers
Senegal international footballers
Olympic footballers of Senegal
Footballers at the 2012 Summer Olympics
Senegalese expatriate footballers
Expatriate footballers in Argentina
Expatriate footballers in Spain
Expatriate footballers in Russia
Expatriate footballers in France
Expatriate footballers in Romania
Expatriate footballers in Turkey
Senegalese expatriate sportspeople in Argentina
Senegalese expatriate sportspeople in Spain
Senegalese expatriate sportspeople in Russia
Senegalese expatriate sportspeople in France
Senegalese expatriate sportspeople in Romania
Senegalese expatriate sportspeople in Turkey